Cobram Victory was a football club located in Cobram, Victoria, Australia, a small town on the Murray River. They compete in the Goulburn North East Football Association.

Cobram Victory is most notable for its giant-killing run in the 2011 Mirabella Cup.

History 
Victory played its first season of GNEFA in 2007, having previously competed under the name Murray Border-United in the Albury Wodonga Football Association.

March 2010 saw Craig Carley, formerly of AFC Wimbledon and also Metropolitan Police FC join the club and was appointed as coach in season 2011.

The club received attention in 2011 in the Mirabella Cup, defeating major clubs Whittlesea Zebras and Clifton Hill before finally falling to the eventual runners-up, Victorian Premier League side Melbourne Knights in the Super 12 stage.

Victory went on to win the Regional Challenge Cup, defeating Ballarat Red Devils at AAMI Park

At the end of the 2012 season Cobram Victory claimed the inaugural Regional Premier League title, with a 5–0 win over Shepparton SC at Deakin Reserve. In 2014 the club merged with Cobram Soccer Club to Cobram Roar FC.

Colours 
Cobram Victory is nicknamed "Victory" and its home colours are white with yellow trimming and a black V, both in imitation of A-League club Melbourne Victory. The club logo also tributes Melbourne Victory in its design.

Honours 
 Regional Premier League:
Winners (1): 2012
 Dockerty Regional Challenge Cup:
Winners (2): 2011, 2013

See also 
2011 Mirabella Cup

References

External links 

Soccer clubs in Victoria (Australia)
Association football clubs established in 1998
2007 establishments in Australia
Association football clubs disestablished in 2014
Defunct soccer clubs in Australia